WCCH (103.5 FM) is a low-power community radio station broadcasting in the Holyoke, Massachusetts, United States area. The station is owned by Holyoke Community College. WCCH plays a variety of programming 24/7 over the air.

References

External links

CCH
Holyoke Community College
Mass media in Holyoke, Massachusetts
Mass media in Hampden County, Massachusetts
Radio stations established in 1977